The Antelope, now housing a restaurant called  Hajee's Spices, is a grade II listed building on the Stratford Road in Sparkhill, Birmingham, England. It opened as a public house called The Antelope in 1924.

The building features bas-relief carvings designed by local artist William Bloye and sculpted by his assistant, Tom Wright.

Hajees Spices was replaced in 2020 by Des Pardes, but by 2021 the building was to let again. In 2023 it is being converted into another restaurant called Blac.

References

External links 

Pubs in Birmingham, West Midlands
Restaurants in Birmingham, West Midlands
Former pubs in England
Grade II listed buildings in Birmingham
Sparkhill